Fog and Night is a 2007 Turkish adventure film directed by Turgut Yasalar.

Cast 
 Uğur Polat - Sedat
 Selma Ergeç - Mine
  - Madam Eleni
  - Ismet
  - Melike
 Sinan Albayrak - Mustafa

References

External links 

2000s adventure films
Films based on Turkish novels
Turkish adventure films